The PGM-17A Thor was the first operational ballistic missile of the United States Air Force (USAF). It was named after the Norse god of thunder. Able to reach Moscow from Europe, it was deployed in the United Kingdom between 1959 and September 1963 as an intermediate-range ballistic missile (IRBM) with thermonuclear warheads. It was later augmented in the U.S. IRBM arsenal by the Jupiter.

The Thor and later Delta families of space launch vehicles used boosters derived from the initial Thor missile.

History

Fearful that the Soviet Union would deploy a long-range ballistic missile before the U.S., in January 1956 the USAF began developing the Thor, a  intermediate-range ballistic missile. The program proceeded quickly as a stop-gap measure, and within three years of inception the first of 20 Royal Air Force Thor squadrons became operational in the UK. The UK deployment carried the codename 'Project Emily'. One of the advantages of the design was that, unlike the Jupiter MRBM, the Thor could be carried by the USAF's cargo aircraft of the time, which made its deployment more rapid. The launch facilities were not transportable and had to be built on site. Once the first generation of ICBMs based in the US became operational, Thor missiles were quickly retired. The last of the missiles was withdrawn from operational alert in 1963.

A small number of Thors with "Thrust Augmented Delta" boosters and W-49 Mod 6 warheads remained operational in the anti-satellite missile role as Program 437 until April 1975. These missiles were based on Johnston Island in the Pacific Ocean and had the ability to destroy satellites in low Earth orbit. With prior warning of an impending launch, they could destroy a Soviet spy satellite soon after orbital insertion.

Initial development

Development of the Thor was initiated by the USAF in 1954. This range would allow Moscow to be attacked from a launch site in the UK. The initial design studies were headed by Cmdr. Robert Truax (US Navy) and Dr. Adolph K. Thiel (Ramo-Wooldridge Corporation, formerly of Redstone Arsenal and previously of Nazi Germany). They refined the specifications to an IRBM with:

 A  range
 A gross takeoff weight of 
 Propulsion provided by half of the existing Navaho-derived Atlas booster engine
  maximum speed during warhead reentry
 Inertial guidance system with radio backup (for low susceptibility to enemy disruption)

Thor had vernier engines for roll control flanking the main engine, similar to the Atlas vernier engines on the sides of the propellant tanks.

On 30 November 1955, three companies were given one week to bid on the project: Douglas, Lockheed, and North American Aviation. The missile was to use existing technology, skills, abilities, and techniques to speed entry into service. On 27 December 1955, Douglas was awarded the prime contract for the airframe and integration. The Rocketdyne division of North American Aviation was awarded the engine contract, AC Spark Plug the primary inertial guidance system, Bell Labs the backup radio guidance system, and General Electric the nose cone/reentry vehicle. Douglas' proposal included choosing bolted tank bulkheads (as opposed to the initially suggested welded ones) and a tapered fuel tank for improved aerodynamics.

The engine was a direct descendant of the Atlas MA-3 booster engine, with removal of one thrust chamber and a rerouting of the plumbing to allow the engine to fit within the smaller Thor thrust section.

Engine component tests began in March 1956. The first engineering model engine was available in June, followed by the first flight engine in September. Early Thor engines suffered from foaming turbopump lubricating oil at high altitudes and bearing retention issues, resulting in several launch failures. The initial Thor tests in 1957 used an early version of the Rocketdyne LR-79 engine with a conical nozzle and 135,000 pounds of thrust. By early 1958, this had been replaced by an improved model with a bell-shaped nozzle see and 150,000 pounds of thrust. The fully developed Thor IRBM had 162,000 pounds of thrust.

Phase I test launches
Thor was test launched from LC-17 at Cape Canaveral Missile Annex. The compressed development schedule meant that plans for the Atlas bunker had to be used to allow the completion of the facility in time, with launchpad LC-17B completed just in time for the first test flight.

Missile 101, the first flight-ready Thor, arrived at Cape Canaveral in October 1956. It was erected at LC-17B and underwent several practice propellant loading/unloading exercises, a static firing test, and a month-long delay while a defective relay was replaced. Launch finally took place on 25 January 1957. The engine lost thrust almost immediately after liftoff, and the Thor fell onto the launch pad and exploded. A film of prelaunch preparations showed crews dragging a LOX filler hose through a sandy area, and it was that debris that had entered the LOX, causing the failure of a valve.

Thor 102 was launched on 20 April. The booster performed normally, but the flight was terminated at 35 seconds after an erroneous console readout caused the Range Safety Officer to believe that the missile was headed inland instead of out to sea. The tracking console was found to be wired in reverse. The short flight raised confidence that Thor could fly successfully.

The third Thor launch (Missile 103) exploded four minutes before the planned launch after a defective valve allowed LOX tank pressure to build up to unsafe levels. The responsible technicians had also failed to pay attention to the tank pressure gauges. LC-17B consequently had to be repaired for the second time in four months.

Missile 104, launched 22 August from the newly opened LC-17A, broke up at T+92 seconds due to a drop in signal strength from the programmer, causing the engine to gimbal hard right. The guidance system tried to compensate, but the resulting structural loads exceeded the strength of the missile tankage.

Thor 105 (20 September) completed the first successful flight, which occurred 21 months after the start of the program.

Missile 107 (3 October) fell back onto LC-17A and exploded at launch when a gas generator valve failed to open.

Missile 108 (11 October) exploded around T+140 seconds without prior warning. Engineers were initially unable to determine the cause of the failure. After the first Thor-Able launch failed six months later due to a seized turbopump, it was concluded that a similar failure had occurred on 108. However, 108 did not have sufficient instrumentation to determine the exact nature of the failure.

The final three Thor tests during 1957 were all successful. 1958 began with back-to-back failures. Thor 114 was destroyed by Range Safety 150 seconds into launch when the guidance system lost power and Thor 120's engine shut down slightly under two minutes after liftoff. The telemetry system had experienced a power failure during launch, so the reason for the engine cutoff could not be satisfactorily determined.

On 19 April, Missile 121 dropped back onto LC-17B and exploded, putting the pad out of action for three months. A fuel duct collapse was believed to have been the culprit.

On 22 April, Missile 117, carrying the first Able upper stage, lost thrust and broke up at T+146 seconds due to a turbopump failure.

The Jupiter, Thor, and Atlas missiles all used a variant of the Rocketdyne LR-79 engine and all three suffered launch failures due to a marginal turbopump design. There were two separate problems with the pumps. The first was the discovery during testing at Huntsville that the lubricant oil tended to foam at high altitude as the air pressure decreased. The other was that pump shaft vibration from the nearly 10,000 RPM operating speed would cause the bearings to come out of their sockets, resulting in the pump abruptly seizing up. The Army had suspended Jupiter launches for four months until the turbopump issues could be resolved, and as a result no more pump failures affected that program.

In contrast, the USAF's General Schreiver rejected the idea of sending Thor and Atlas missiles back to the factory so as to not delay the testing program. Instead, in-field modifications to pressurize the turbopump gearboxes and use an oil with a different viscosity that was less prone to foaming were conducted. Modified bearing retainers were not installed. Subsequently, six consecutive Thor and Atlas launches failed during February–April 1958, several due to turbopump problems. The following four months did not include any turbopump failures, but the 17 August launch of the world's first lunar probe on Thor-Able 127 ended in an explosion due to a turbopump failure. A month later, Atlas 6B also suffered a turbopump failure and the Air Force gave in and agreed to replace the turbopumps in all of their missiles, after which there were no more launch failures due to a turbopump problem.

Five successful Thor tests were conducted in June–July 1958, the last one carrying a mouse named Wickie on a biological mission; the capsule sank into the ocean and could not be recovered. Thor 126 (26 July) lost thrust 50 seconds into launch when a LOX valve inadvertently closed. The vehicle pitched down and broke up from aerodynamic loads. On 30 July, six Douglas technicians were severely burned, three fatally, when a LOX valve failed at the Thor static test stand in Sacramento, California.

Phase II launches

Phase II testing with the AC Spark Plug inertial guidance system began 7 December with the first successful flight on 19 December 1957.

The operational variant of the Thor, the DM-18A, began testing in the autumn of 1958, but Missile 138 (5 November) went out of control shortly after liftoff and had to be destroyed. Nonetheless, Thor was declared operational and testing now began at Vandenberg Air Force Base on the West Coast when Missile 151 flew successfully on 16 December. On 30 December, a near repeat performance of the 5 November failure happened when Missile 149 lost control and was destroyed 40 seconds into launch.

After a run of successful launches during the first half of 1959, Missile 191, the first to be launched by a Royal Air Force crew, suffered another control malfunction while being launched from VAFB. This time, the missile's pitch and roll program failed to activate and it continued flying straight up. Launch crews initially did nothing as they reasoned that the Earth's rotation would gradually take it away from land and they wished to continue collecting data as long as possible. Eventually though, they became nervous about it exploding or pitching over, so the destruct command was sent around 50 seconds into launch. High-altitude wind caused debris to land in the town of Orcutt near the base. After Thor 203 repeated the same failure four weeks later, an investigation found that the culprit was a safety wire that had been meant to prevent the control tape in the programmer from inadvertently coming loose during vehicle assembly. The wire would ordinarily be cut after installation of the programmer in the missile, but Douglas technicians had forgotten this important step, thus the tape could not be spooled and the pitch and roll sequence did not activate. Another 23 Thor missile tests were carried out during 1959, with only one failure, when Missile 185 on 16 December, the second RAF launch, broke up due to a control malfunction.

Service rivalry with Jupiter
The Jupiter missile, a joint effort of Chrysler and the Redstone Arsenal in Huntsville, Alabama, was originally designed to attack high-value targets like airfields, train switching yards and command and control sites with extremely high accuracy.

During development, the US Navy became involved in the Jupiter program, with the objective of arming submarines with a ballistic missile. This led to the Jupiter's squat shape, which allowed it to be stored within the confines of a submarine hull. However, the Navy was always concerned about the extremely risky situation of a liquid-fueled rocket stored in the confines of a submarine. By 1956, the Polaris program was proposed instead, which featured a solid-fueled SLBM that was much lighter and safer to store. The Navy quickly switched to Polaris and dropped Jupiter.

With two IRBMs of nearly identical capabilities, it seemed obvious that only one of the two would ultimately achieve operational status, resulting in a competition between the Army and Air Force. Jupiter's testing program began two months after Thor's and proceeded more smoothly. Accidents such as the explosion of Thor 103 were avoided, and the turbopump issues that plagued early Rocketdyne engines were also resolved in Jupiter much earlier than the Air Force's missiles.

The Jupiter program was more successful due to far better testing and preparation, with each missile given a full duration static firing in Huntsville prior to delivery. Thors were given a PFRF (Pre Flight Readiness Firing) prior to launch; these were between 5–15 seconds only as the launching facilities were not designed for a full duration firing. Missile 107 had not been given a PFRF at all and its launch ended in a pad explosion. A static firing stand for Thor tests was only opened in May 1958, at which point the missile's launch record stood at four successes and nine failures, including four launchpad explosions. For comparison, at the end of May 1958 Jupiter had five successes and three failures with no pad explosions. Thanks to the thorough testing done at Huntsville, Jupiter missiles mostly all arrived at CCAS in flight-ready condition while Thors typically required extensive repairs or modification before launch.

After the Soviet launches of Sputnik 1–2 in late 1957, US Secretary of Defense Charles Wilson announced that both Thor and Jupiter would go into service as his final act before leaving office. This was both out of fear of Soviet capabilities and also to avoid political repercussions from the workplace layoffs that would result at either Douglas or Chrysler if one of the two missiles were canceled.

Deployment

Deployment of the IRBM fleet to Europe proved more difficult than expected, as no NATO members other than the UK accepted the offer to have Thor missiles stationed on their soil. Italy and Turkey both agreed to accept Jupiter missiles. Thor was deployed to the UK starting in August 1958, operated by 20 squadrons of RAF Bomber Command under US-UK dual key control. The first active unit was No. 77 Squadron RAF at RAF Feltwell in 1958, with the remaining units becoming active in 1959. All were deactivated by September 1963.

All 60 of the Thor missiles deployed in the UK were based at above-ground launch sites. The missiles were stored horizontally on transporter-erector trailers and covered by a retractable missile shelter. To fire the weapon, the crew used an electric motor to roll back the missile shelter, essentially a long shed mounted on steel rails, then used a powerful hydraulic launcher-erector to lift the missile to an upright position for launch. Once it was standing on the launch mount, the missile was fueled and could be fired. The entire launch sequence, from starting to roll back the missile shelter through to ignition of the rocket engine and lift-off, took approximately 15 minutes. At that point the reentry vehicle separated from the missile fuselage and began its descent toward the target. Total flight time from launch to target impact was approximately 18 minutes.

The Thor was initially deployed with a very blunt conical G.E. Mk 2 'heat sink' re-entry vehicle. They were later converted to the slender G.E. Mk 3 ablative RV. Both RVs contained a W-49 thermonuclear warhead with an explosive yield of 1.44 megatons.

The IRBM program was quickly eclipsed by the Air Force's ICBM program and made redundant. By 1959, with Atlas well on its way to operational status, Thor and Jupiter became obsolete, although both remained in service as missiles until 1963. In retrospect, the IRBM program was a poorly conceived idea as it depended on the cooperation of NATO allies, most of whom were not willing to have nuclear missiles on their soil, and was also surpassed by the ICBM program, yet continued anyway for political reasons and a desire to keep the workforce at their respective assembly plants employed.

Thor's lasting legacy was not as a missile, but its use as the basis for the Thor/Delta space launcher family into the 21st century.

Nuclear-armed test flights
 2 June 1962, failed Bluegill flight, tracking lost after launch, Thor and nuclear device destroyed.
 19 June 1962, failed Starfish flight, Thor and nuclear device destroyed 59 seconds after launch at  altitude.
The warhead detonated with a yield of 1.45 Mt of TNT (6.07 PJ). This was the Starfish Prime event of nuclear test series Operation Fishbowl.
 25 July 1962, failed Bluegill Prime flight, Thor and nuclear device destroyed on launch pad, which was contaminated with plutonium.

1963 mystery cloud
On February 28, 1963, a Thor rocket carrying a spy satellite into orbit was launched from Vandenberg Airforce Base. The rocket went off course and mission control detonated the rocket at an altitude of 44 km before it could reach orbit. The rocket detonation produced a large circular cloud that appeared over the southwestern United States. Due to its mysterious nature, appearing at a very high altitude and being visible for hundreds of miles, the cloud attracted widespread attention and was published by the news media. The cloud was featured on the cover of Science Magazine in April 1963, Weatherwise Magazine in May 1963, and had a full page image published in the May issue of Life Magazine. Prof. James MacDonald at the University of Arizona Institute for Atmospheric Physics investigated the phenomena and linked the it to the Thor rocket launch after contacting military personnel at Vandenberg Air Force Base. When the launch records were later declassified, the United States Air Force released a memo explaining that the cloud was the result of a military operation.

Launch vehicle

Despite being retired from deployment as a missile a few years after deployment, the Thor rocket found widespread use as a space launch vehicle. It was the first in a large family of space launch vehicles—the Delta rockets. The last remaining direct descendant of the Thor, the Delta II, was retired in 2018, and the Delta IV is based on mostly new technology, unlike the Delta II.

Former operators

 United States Air Force
 RAF South Ruislip
 705th Strategic Missile Wing (1958–1960)

 Royal Air Force
RAF Bomber Command
see Project Emily Stations and Squadrons

Specifications (PGM-17A)
Family: Thor IRBM, Thor DM-18 (single stage LV); Thor DM-19 (rocket 1st stage), Thor DM-21 (rocket 1st stage), Thor DSV-2 (suborbital launch vehicle), Thor DSV-2J (anti-ballistic missile), Thor DSV-2U (orbital launch vehicle).
Overall length: 
Span: 
Weight: 
Empty weight: 
Core Diameter: 2.44 m
Minimum to Maximum: 
Ceiling: 
Guidance: Inertial
Maximum speed: 
Engines:
Vernier: 2x Rocketdyne LR101-NA; 4.5 kN (1000 lbf) each
Rocketdyne LR79-NA-9 (Model S-3D);
Propellants: LOX/RP-1 Kerosene
Liftoff Thrust (sl): 670 kN (150,000 lbf)
Thrust (vac): 760 kN
Specific Impulse: 
Specific Impulse (sea level): 
Burn time: 165 s
Mass Engine: 643 kg
Diameter: 2.44 m
Chambers: 1
Chamber Pressure: 4.1 MPa
Area Ratio: 8.00
Thrust to Weight Ratio: 120.32
Warhead
One W49 warhead on Mk. 2 reentry vehicle
warhead mass: 
Yield: equivalent to 1.44 Megatons of TNT (6.02 PJ)
CEP: 
First Flight: 1958
Last Flight: 1980
Total Number Built: 224
Total Development Built: 64
Total Production Built: 160
Flown: 145.
Development Cost US dollars: $500 million
Recurring Price US dollars: $6.25 million
Flyaway Unit Cost: US$750,000 in 1958 dollars
Launches: 59
Failures: 14
Success Rate: 76.27%
First Launch Date: 25 January 1957
Last Launch Date: 5 November 1975

See also

Project Emily

References

Further reading
 Boyes, John. Project Emily: The Thor IRBM and the Royal Air Force 1959–1963. Prospero, Journal of the British Rocketry Oral History Programme (BROHP) No 4, Spring 2007.
 Boyes, John. Project Emily: Thor IRBM and the RAF. Tempus Publishing, 2008. .
 Boyes, John. The Thor IRBM: The Cuan Missile Crisis and the subsequent run-down of the Thor Force. pub: Royal Air Force Historical Society. Journal 42, May 2008. .
 Boyes, John. Thor Ballistic Missile: The United States and United Kingdom in Partnership. Fonthill Media, 2015. .
 Forsyth, Kevin S. Delta: The Ultimate Thor. In Roger Launius and Dennis Jenkins (Eds.), To Reach The High Frontier: A History of U.S. Launch Vehicles. Lexington: University Press of Kentucky, 2002. .
 Hartt, Julian. The Mighty Thor: Missile in Readiness. New York: Duell, Sloan, and Pearce, 1961.
 Melissen, Jan. "The Thor saga: Anglo‐American nuclear relations, US IRBM development and deployment in Britain, 1955–1959." Journal of Strategic Studies 15#2 (1992): 172-207.

Books referencing RAF use
 Jefford, C.G. RAF Squadrons, a Comprehensive record of the Movement and Equipment of all RAF Squadrons and their Antecedents since 1912. Shrewsbury, Shropshire, UK: Airlife Publishing, 1988 (second edition 2001). . p. 178.
 Wynn, Humphrey. RAF Strategic Nuclear Deterrent Forces, their Origins, Roles and Deployment 1946–69. London: HMSO, 1994. . p. 449.

External links
Thor from Encyclopedia Astronautica
Thor IRBM History site
History of the Delta Launch Vehicle
UK Thor missile launch sites on Secret Bases website
Maxwell Hunter, "Father of the Thor Rocket"
"YouTube contemporary film of Thor missiles at North Pickenham"

1960 in spaceflight
1961 in spaceflight
1963 in spaceflight
Cold War missiles of the United States
Nuclear weapons of the United States
Intermediate-range ballistic missiles of the United States
Theatre ballistic missiles
Military equipment introduced in the 1950s